Iwan Nawi is a Taiwanese Seediq politician. She has served as the Deputy Minister of Council of Indigenous Peoples since 20 May 2016.

Iwan obtained her bachelor's degree in Chinese literature from Chinese Culture University, and master's and doctoral degrees in ethnology from National Chengchi University.

References

Government ministers of Taiwan
Living people
Seediq people
Year of birth missing (living people)
Chinese Culture University alumni
National Chengchi University alumni